Lambana is a genus of moths of the family Noctuidae. The genus was erected by Francis Walker in 1866.

Species
Lambana cucullatalis Walker, [1866] Brazil (Ega)
Lambana diagramma (Hampson, 1911) Brazil (Rio de Janeiro)
Lambana harsha (Schaus, 1911) Costa Rica
Lambana lebana (Schaus, 1911) Costa Rica
Lambana necoda (Schaus, 1911) Costa Rica
Lambana palliola (Dyar, 1914) Panama
Lambana ziha (Schaus, 1911) Costa Rica

References

Acontiinae